Merit badge may refer to:
Merit badge (Boy Scouts of America)
Merit badge (Scouting Ireland)

See also 
 Military awards and decorations
 Scout badge

Scout and Guide awards